Orthemis  is a genus of large Neotropical dragonflies, commonly called Tropical King Skimmers. The males are generally red and the females brown.

Species
The genus contains the following species:

References

Libellulidae
Anisoptera genera
Taxa named by Hermann August Hagen